United Nations Security Council resolution 1606, adopted unanimously on 20 June 2005, after reaffirming its support for the Arusha Peace Agreement regarding the situation in Burundi, the Council requested the Secretary-General Kofi Annan to begin negotiations on a truth commission and special chamber within the country's court system.

Resolution

Observations
For the purposes of peace and reconciliation in Burundi, the council was convinced that the establishment of a truth commission to bring those responsible for genocide, crime against humanity and war crimes to justice in order to end impunity in the African Great Lakes region. It also noted that international assistance was necessary to establish a society and government under the rule of law. The transitional government of Burundi called for a mixed truth commission and a special chamber within the Burundian judicial system.

Acts
The secretary-general was asked to begin discussions with the transitional government and other parties on how to implement the recommendations of the government, and to report by 30 September 2005 with details of its implementation, including costs, structures and a time frame.

See also
 Burundi Civil War
 List of United Nations Security Council Resolutions 1601 to 1700 (2005–2006)
 Truth and Reconciliation Commission (Burundi)
 United Nations Integrated Office in Burundi

References

External links
 
Text of the Resolution at undocs.org

 1606
2005 in Burundi
 1606
June 2005 events